Óscar Oswaldo Larriva Alvarado (1946 – 6 January 2020) was an Ecuadorian politician. He was a member of the National Congress from 1992 to 1994, and served as governor of Azuay Province between 2007 and 2009. Larriva returned to the legislature, which had been reconstituted as the National Assembly, from 2013 to 2017. He returned to the governorship of Azuay Province in 2019.

On 6 January 2020, Larriva died from cancer at age 74.

References

1946 births
2020 deaths
Deaths from cancer in Ecuador
People from Azuay Province
Deaths from leukemia
Members of the second National Assembly (Ecuador)
Members of the National Congress (Ecuador)